Pervomaysky is a rural locality (a settlement) in Posyolok Krasnoye Ekho, Gus-Khrustalny District, Vladimir Oblast, Russia. The population was 14 as of 2010.

Geography 
The village is located 22 km south-east from Krasnoye Ekho, 26 km north-east from Gus-Khrustalny.

References 

Rural localities in Gus-Khrustalny District